Greenville Municipal Stadium is a stadium in Greenville, South Carolina, U.S., that was built in 1984 and holds 7,048 people. It is located on Mauldin Road off exit 46C on I-85.

It was primarily used for baseball, and was the home field of the Greenville Bombers minor league baseball team before West End Field opened in 2006. It was also home to the Greenville Braves before they moved to Pearl, Mississippi, after the 2004 season.  It hosted the Atlantic Coast Conference baseball tournament from 1987 to 1995.

The former stadium is now known as Conestee Park, a baseball complex and  part of the Greenville County Recreation District.

References

External links
Greenville Municipal Stadium Views - Ball Parks of the Minor Leagues

Minor league baseball venues
Baseball venues in South Carolina
Sports venues in Greenville, South Carolina
1984 establishments in South Carolina
Sports venues completed in 1984